Fork of Vevey is an ,  stainless steel fork on the shore of Lake Geneva in Vevey, Switzerland. Fork of Vevey is a part of the Alimentarium, a Vevey-based museum with a permanent exhibition on food and Nestlé's history.

The fork was initially created in 1995 by the Swiss artist Jean-Pierre Zaugg to mark the Alimentarium’s tenth anniversary. The fork was removed in 1996 but reinstated about a decade later, following a public petition. The Alimentarium claims that the Fork of Vevey is the world's largest fork, and since 2014 the Guinness Book of World Records has listed it as such, but there is a larger fork ( long) in Springfield, Missouri, and an even larger one ( long) in Creede, Colorado.

References

External links
 Fork of Vevey, a monument on Geneva Lake by Alimentarium.

Monuments and memorials in Switzerland